Big Funny is an album by American comedian Jeff Foxworthy. It was released by DreamWorks Records on April 25, 2000. The album peaked at number 143 on the Billboard 200 chart.

Track listing
All tracks written by Jeff Foxworthy and Ritch Shydner except where noted
"Introduction" – 0:46
"Seeing Things on the Road" – 3:39
"I'd Thought I'd Heard Every Redneck Thing" – 1:57
"Telephones in the Bathroom" – 1:11
"Jeff Gordon Enunciates" – 2:13
"Speaking of Words" – 1:12
"The Way I Grew Up" – 1:58
"My Wife's Family" – 5:52
"House Full of Girls" – 4:50
"It's a Different World" – 5:03
"I Don't Need to Know That" – 1:27
"You Are Being Trained" – 1:13
"Women Want to Talk" – 6:17
"Thanks Y'all (Encore)" – 2:18
"Blue Collar Dollar" (Bill Engvall, Foxworthy, Doug Grau, Porter Howell) – 3:07
with Bill Engvall and Marty Stuart

Personnel
 Adapted from AllMusic:
 J. T. Corenflos - electric guitar
 Chad Cromwell - drums
 Diana DeWitt - backing vocals
 Porter Howell - acoustic guitar, electric guitar
 Tim Lauer - keyboards
 Gary Oleyar - fiddle
 Kim Parent - backing vocals
 Alison Prestwood - bass
 Marty Stuart - vocals, electric guitar
 Russell Terrell - backing vocals

Chart performance

References

2000 albums
Jeff Foxworthy albums
DreamWorks Records albums
2000s comedy albums